Koidu Secondary School is a government-sponsored secondary school located in Koidu City, Kono District, Sierra Leone. The school is the largest and most prominent secondary school in Kono District and one of the largest in the country. The current principal is Mr KAI E. JIMMY.

Notable alumni
Some of Sierra Leone's most gifted students have come from the Koidu Secondary School. The school has a history of producing some of Sierra Leone's most prominent people, including current Sierra Leone's vice president Samuel Sam-Sumana, principal Ansarul Islamic Boys Secondary School Mohamed Wura Jalloh, retired colonel Komba Mondeh Sierra Leone Army, retired captain Samuel Komba Kambo Sierra Leone Army, and footballers Komba Yomba  Damaand Solomon Yambasu. Others include  Dennis Kaiyomba Turner, Sahr Max Lebbie, Aiah Bindi, Osman Turay, Bintu Jabbie, District Manager iEARN Kono Paul Komba Pessima and several prominent Sierra Leoneans.

Secondary schools in Sierra Leone
Educational institutions established in 1965
Koidu
1965 establishments in Sierra Leone